Concoction is the process of preparing a medicine, food or other substance out of many ingredients, and also the result of such a process.

Historically, the word referred to digestion, as conceived by Aristotle who theorized that this was the result of the heat of the body acting upon the material, causing it to mature and ripen.

The term later came to refer to liquid broths, cocktails and potions which are similarly formed by heating or blending multiple ingredients. Concoctions that were made in apothecaries, or as used in traditional medicine, rather than nourishment or pleasure (in which case it would be cookery or cuisine). In a medical context, such concoctions have largely been superseded by modern medicine.

In modern usage, the term may refer more loosely to any mixture of various ingredients, including soups and cocktails, or abstract ingredients, such as design elements in architecture or fashion, or an elaborate excuse. 
 In such uses, the term often retains a connotation that the mixture is strange, unusual, or elaborate.

References

Chemical mixtures
History of pharmacy
Biologically-based therapies
Traditional medicine